Tim Smyczek was the defending champion but lost to Erik Crepaldi in the first round.
Unseeded American Tennys Sandgren won the title defeating Australian 7th seed Samuel Groth 3–6, 6–3, 7–6(7–5).

Seeds

Draw

Finals

Top half

Bottom half

References
 Main Draw
 Qualifying Draw

JSM Challenger of Champaign-Urbana - Singles
2013 Singles